The 2000 Arab Super Cup was an international club competition played by the winners and runners up of the Arab Club Champions Cup and Arab Cup Winners' Cup. It was the seventh edition and was won by Al Shabab of Saudi Arabia.

Teams
Al-Faisaly was shosen to take part to the competition as semi-finalist of the 1999 Arab Cup Winners' Cup, because the runners-up Al-Jaish was also a runners-up of the 1999 Arab Club Champions Cup and was shosen because that.

Results and standings

References

External links
Arab Super Cup 2000 - rsssf.com

2000
Arab Super Cup, 2000
2000–01 in Syrian football
2000–01 in Jordanian football
2000–01 in Qatari football